Harry Sullivan (8 April 1932 – 5 February 2017) was an Australian rules footballer, who played in the Victorian Football League, (VFL).

Harry Sullivan commenced his VFL career at Carlton in 1950 after playing in their Thirds (juniors) premiership team the previous year. In 1955 he transferred to Collingwood. He was at full back in the losing 1956 Grand Final, and in 1958 he helped Collingwood to an upset win over Melbourne in the VFL Grand Final.

Sullivan died on 5 February 2017, at the age of 84.

References

External links
 
 

1932 births
2017 deaths
Australian rules footballers from Victoria (Australia)
Carlton Football Club players
Collingwood Football Club players
Collingwood Football Club Premiership players
One-time VFL/AFL Premiership players